En la ardiente oscuridad (In the Burning Darkness) is a 1958 Argentine film based on a play of the same name by Antonio Buero Vallejo.

Plot
This conventional drama by director Daniel Tinayre handles a distinctive subject—the onset of blindness in an adult—and raises issues about the disability without diving far under the surface. The setting is an institution for the blind, and the featured protagonist is a man who rails against his misfortune, his energy and thinking distorted by a need to fight his blindness. Unhappy and unable to come to grips with his condition, he stirs a sympathetic chord in another blind inmate. She in turn, slowly enters into a relationship with him that starts to transform the ways he perceives himself and his blindness.

Cast

External links

References

1958 films
1950s Spanish-language films
Argentine black-and-white films
Films directed by Daniel Tinayre
1950s Argentine films

es:En la ardiente oscuridad#Representaciones destacadas